Rahns is an unincorporated village along the Perkiomen Creek in Perkiomen Township, Montgomery County, Pennsylvania. Rahns was founded in 1865 and named for an early settler, George Rahn.

References 

Unincorporated communities in Montgomery County, Pennsylvania
Unincorporated communities in Pennsylvania